Maurice Deelen is a Dutch former swimmer.  He won a silver medal at the 2012 Paralympic Games in the 50m freestyle, and bronze medals in the 100m breast and 200m individual medley.  He also placed 4th in the 100m freestyle in London.  He competed in the Paralympic class S8.  Deelen competed in the IPC Euros, winning a silver medal in the 100m freestyle and a gold in the 50m freestyle. In 2012 Deelen won the 100m breaststroke at the Eindhoven swim cup. At age 30, Deelen had a stroke that caused continuing amnesia. In 2009, Deelen won silver medals in the 50m and 100m freestyle at the IPC World Championship. In 2010, Deelen won a silver medal in the 100m breaststroke and bronze medals in the 50m and 100m freestyle at the IPC World Championship.

References

1971 births
Living people
Paralympic swimmers of the Netherlands
Swimmers at the 2012 Summer Paralympics
Paralympic silver medalists for the Netherlands
Medalists at the 2012 Summer Paralympics
Paralympic medalists in swimming
Dutch male breaststroke swimmers
Dutch male medley swimmers
Dutch male freestyle swimmers
S8-classified Paralympic swimmers
20th-century Dutch people
21st-century Dutch people